Stanisław Romik (22 May 1926 – 18 June 2016) was a Polish sports shooter. He competed in the 50 metre pistol event at the 1960 Summer Olympics. He died in June 2016 at the age of 90.

References

1926 births
2016 deaths
Polish male sport shooters
Olympic shooters of Poland
Shooters at the 1960 Summer Olympics
People from Będzin County
Sportspeople from Silesian Voivodeship